Woodsboro is a town in Frederick County, Maryland, United States that was granted to Joseph Wood in 1693. The population was 1,141 at the 2010 census.

History
The town was named after Joseph Wood. The LeGore Bridge was listed on the National Register of Historic Places in 1978 and Woods Mill Farm was listed in 2007.

In 1895, Dr. George F. Smith founded Rosebud Perfume Company in Woodsboro. Smith had eight children, and served as mayor of the town for 19 years. The business has remained in the family, and as of 2012, was still producing its famous "Smith's Rosebud Salve," a lip gloss and salve originally known as tholene. The products are shipped from company headquarters in Woodsboro; however, "the salve is manufactured and filled at Case Mason in Joppa, Md., and the tins are made in Baltimore."

The Woodsboro Savings Bank, and several buildings associated with the three limestone quarries near the town are among the structures which have been considered for historic preservation.

Government
Unlike most cities, the executive officer of Woodsboro, Maryland is called a burgess. The current Burgess of Woodsboro is Heath Barnes,

Geography
Woodsboro is located at  (39.534400, -77.314329).

Transportation
The main means of transport to and from Woodsboro is by road, and two primary state highways serve the town. Maryland Route 194 traverses the area northeast to southwest, connecting the Frederick area to Taneytown. Maryland Route 550 follows a northwest-to-southeast alignment, providing connections to Thurmont and Libertytown. Both roads follow the same alignment for a short distance on the northeast side of Woodsboro.

Demographics

2010 census
As of the census of 2010, there were 1,141 people, 423 households, and 306 families living in the town. The racial makeup of the town was 91.9% White, 3.7% African American, 0.1% Native American, 1.3% Asian, 1.1% from other races, and 1.9% from two or more races. Hispanic or Latino of any race were 4.0% of the population.

There were 423 households, of which 38.1% had children under the age of 18 living with them, 60.5% were married couples living together, 7.8% had a female householder with no husband present, 4.0% had a male householder with no wife present, and 27.7% were non-families. 25.1% of all households were made up of individuals, and 12.5% had someone living alone who was 65 years of age or older. The average household size was 2.70 and the average family size was 3.23.

The median age in the town was 41.1 years. 27% of residents were under the age of 18; 8.3% were between the ages of 18 and 24; 19.9% were from 25 to 44; 32.7% were from 45 to 64; and 12.1% were 65 years of age or older. The gender makeup of the town was 46.6% male and 53.4% female.

2000 census
As of the census of 2000, there were 846 people, 273 households, and 229 families living in the town. The racial makeup of the town was 98.46% White, 0.24% African American, 0.59% Asian, 0.24% from other races, and 0.47% from two or more races. Hispanic or Latino of any race were 0.95% of the population.

There were 273 households, out of which 50.2% had children under the age of 18 living with them, 74.0% were married couples living together, 6.2% had a female householder with no husband present, and 16.1% were non-families. 13.6% of all households were made up of individuals, and 9.5% had someone living alone who was 65 years of age or older. The average household size was 3.10 and the average family size was 3.37.

In the town, the population was spread out, with 35.3% under the age of 18, 4.7% from 18 to 24, 33.3% from 25 to 44, 17.7% from 45 to 64, and 8.9% who were 65 years of age or older. The median age was 36 years. For every 100 females, there were 94.5 males. For every 100 females age 18 and over, there were 89.9 males.

The median income for a household in the town was $65,000, and the median income for a family was $62,500. Males had a median income of $45,250 versus $26,528 for females. The per capita income for the town was $21,434. About 0.9% of families and 2.0% of the population were below the poverty line, including 1.8% of those under age 18 and 5.7% of those age 65 or over.

References

https://www.fredericknewspost.com/news/politics_and_government/heath-barnes-a-gay-republican-trump-supporter-reflects-on-actions-at-local-protests-and-treatment/article_b2387be7-d50d-5eac-9786-11080938a15c.html

External links

Woodsboro On-Line (Official site)
Woodsboro Volunteer Fire / Rescue Company (Official site)
Woodsboro, Maryland at the Maryland Municipal League

Towns in Maryland
Towns in Frederick County, Maryland